The Witching is a comic book series written by Jonathan Vankin and Leigh Gallagher, with Tara McPherson creating the cover art. This comic was published in the United States by the DC Comics imprint Vertigo. A total of 10 monthly issues were released in 2004 and 2005. Issue #5 featured a guest artist, Mark Buckingham, best known as the regular artist on the Vertigo series, Fables.

References

2004 comics debuts